Majda [ماجدة] is a female given name, most popular in Slovenia, but also in some other areas of former Yugoslavia and Arabic-speaking countries (Egypt, Lebanon, etc.). It means, in Arabic, "the woman with glory". It ranks among the 30 most popular female names in Slovenia. It was most popular with women born between 1941 and 1970. Since the 1990s, only a handful of Slovenian girls have been named Majda.

It is a version of the name Madeleine.

It may refer to:
 Majda Koren (born 1960), Slovenian children writer
 Majda Mehmedović (born 1990), Montenegro Bosniak handball player
 Majda Potokar (1930–2001), Slovenian actress
 Princess Majda Ra'ad (born 1942), Jordanian princess
 Majda Sepe (1937–2006), Slovenian singer
 Majda Širca Ravnikar (born 1953), Slovenian politician, journalist and art historian
 Majda Vrhovnik (1922–1945), Slovenian partisan
Magda Sabbahi (ماجدة born 6 May 1941 Cairo), or Magda, is an Egyptian film actress notable for her rôles from 1949 to 1969.
Majida El Roumi Baradhy (Arabic: ماجدة الرومي برادعي; born 13 December 1956) is a Lebanese soprano.

References 

Given names
Slavic given names
Arabic given names
Feminine given names